The Rockettes are an American precision dance company. Founded 1925 in St. Louis, they have, since , performed at Radio City Music Hall in New York City.  Until 2015, they also had a touring company.  They are best known for starring in the Radio City Christmas Spectacular, an annual Christmas show, and for performing annually since 1957 at the Macy's Thanksgiving Day Parade in New York.

There have been over 3,000 women who have performed as Rockettes since the New York Christmas Spectacular opening night in 1933. The Rockettes also conduct the Rockette Summer Intensive for dancers aspiring to be Rockettes.

History

Early years

The Rockettes were originally inspired by the Tiller Girls, a precision dance company of the United Kingdom established by John Tiller in the 1890s.  Tiller sent the first troupe of Tiller Girls to perform in the United States in 1900, and eventually there were three lines of them working on Broadway.  In 1922, choreographer Russell Markert saw one of these troupes, known as the Tiller Rockets, perform in the Ziegfeld Follies and was inspired to create his own version with American dancers.

As Markert would later recall, "If I ever got a chance to get a group of American girls who would be taller and have longer legs and could do really complicated tap routines and eye-high kicks, they'd really knock your socks off."   They were originally called the Missouri Rockets. After the impresario Roxy brought them to New York for his Roxy Theatre, they were called the Roxyettes. Only later would they become the Rockettes, after Roxy and Radio City Music Hall parted ways.

The Rockettes have long been represented by the American Guild of Variety Artists (AVGA). In 1967, they won a month-long strike for better working conditions, which was led by AGVA salaried officer Penny Singleton. In August 2002, contract negotiations for the troupe's veteran members resulted in a buyout by the owners of Radio City Music Hall. Roughly a fourth of the veteran Rockettes were offered retirement options, while the remaining dancers were offered the opportunity to re-audition.

Discrimination and lack of diversity

The first non-white Rockette, a Japanese-born woman named Setsuko Maruhashi, was not hired until 1985. The Rockettes did not allow dark-skinned dancers into the dance line until 1987. The justification for this policy was that such women would supposedly distract from the consistent look of the dance group. The first African American Rockette was Jennifer Jones; selected in 1987, she made her debut in 1988 at the Super Bowl XXIII halftime show. The first person with a visible disability hired by the Rockettes (Sydney Mesher, missing a left hand due to symbrachydactyly) was hired in 2019.

Radio City Rockettes

On August 1, 2007, the Rockettes were inducted into the St. Louis Walk of Fame.

Rockettes Summer Intensive

From 2002-2019 the Rockettes presented a dance training program called the Rockettes Summer Intensive. This weeklong dance education program offered aspiring dancers the opportunity to train with current Radio City Rockettes and choreographers and learn choreography from the Rockettes repertoire.  Since its inception nearly 100 dancers from this program have become Rockettes.

Trump inauguration controversy
In late 2016, the Madison Square Garden Company, which manages the troupe, agreed to have the Rockettes perform at the inauguration of Donald Trump. According to a report in the New York Daily News, there was an initial "edict" to perform at the inaugural. Immediately several Rockettes dissented, including Rockette Phoebe Pearl who complained that she was being forced to perform at the inaugural against her wishes. One Rockette felt reluctant to "perform for this monster", referring to president-elect Donald Trump, and another said she "wouldn't feel comfortable standing near a man like that in our costumes."

Madison Square Garden issued a statement saying that "For a Rockette to be considered for an event, they must voluntarily sign up and are never told they have to perform at a particular event, including the inaugural. It is always their choice. In fact, for the coming inauguration, we had more Rockettes request to participate than we have slots available." Another report suggested that dancers were allowed to "opt-out" if they thought that they would feel uncomfortable performing.

Many on social media believed attendance was mandatory, including Julissa Sabino, a performer who is part of the union, who tweeted that the issue "breaks my heart" and urged supporters to "help these ladies." Autumn Withers, a former Rockette, supported a boycott, saying "take a knee, ladies!" In December 2016, according to The Atlantic, three of the thirteen full-time dancers had chosen to sit out the event. The company danced to a medley of Irving Berlin songs at the Inaugural Ball on the evening of January 20.

Notable former Rockettes
 Lucille Bremer
 Pat Colgate
 Maria Fletcher
 Adele Jergens
 Jennifer Jones
 Suzanne Kaaren
 Amanda Kloots
 Keltie Knight
 Alicia Luciano
 Margaret E. Lynn
 Joan McCracken
 Kandice Pelletier
 Suzanne Rogers
 Jane Sherman
 Vera-Ellen

References

External links

The Radio City Rockettes – Official Website
Radio City Music Hall – Official Website
Photos: The Rockettes in rehearsal
NY Times 2005 review of Radio City Christmas Spectacular

1925 establishments in Missouri
American girl groups
Dance companies in New York City
Radio City Music Hall